The Obersalzberg Speech is a speech given by Adolf Hitler to Wehrmacht commanders at his Obersalzberg home on 22 August 1939, a week before the German invasion of Poland.

Origin of document 
In August 1939, Louis P. Lochner contacted the American diplomat Alexander Comstock Kirk and showed him the text, but Kirk was not interested. Lochner next contacted the British diplomat George Ogilvie-Forbes, who indeed transmitted it back to London on 25 August 1939. The Canadian historian Michael Marrus wrote that Lochner almost certainly obtained the text from Admiral Wilhelm Canaris, the chief of the Abwehr (German intelligence), who was present at the Obersalzberg Conference.

Three documents were grouped together during Nuremberg Trials that contained Hitler's speech on 22 August 1939 (1014-PS, 798-PS, and L-3,) and only the document L-3 contained a reference to the Armenian genocide. Documents 1014-PS and 798-PS were captured by the United States forces inside the OKW headquarters but the documents did not contain the Armenian quote. On May 16, 1946, during the Nuremberg War Tribunals, a counsel for one of the defendants, Dr. Walter Siemers requested from the president of the trial to strike out the document 1014-PS, but his request was rejected by the president. Document L-3 was brought to the court by an American journalist, Louis P. Lochner.

According to Louis P. Lochner, he, while stationed in Berlin, received a copy of a speech by Hitler from his informant. Lochner later published the speech (in English translation) in his book What About Germany? (New York: Dodd, Mead & Co., 1942) as being indicative of Hitler's desire to conquer the world. In 1945, Lochner handed over a transcript of the German document he had received to the prosecution at the Nuremberg trials, and it was labeled L-3. Hence it is known as the L-3 document. The speech is also found in a footnote to notes about a speech that Hitler held in Obersalzberg on 22 August 1939 and were published in the German Foreign Policy documents When asked in the Nuremberg War Crimes Tribunal who his source was, Lochner said this was a German called "Herr Maasz" but gave vague information about him.

The Times of London quoted from Lochner's version in an unsigned article titled The War Route of the Nazi Germany on 24 November 1945. The article stated that it had been brought forward by the prosecutor on 23 November 1945, as evidence. However, according to the Akten zur deutschen auswärtigen Politik (ser. D, vol. 7, 1961), the document was not introduced as evidence before the International Military Tribunal for undisclosed reasons and is not included in the official publication of the documents in evidence. Two other documents containing minutes of Hitler's Obersalzberg speech(es) had been found among the seized German documents and were introduced as evidence, both omitting the Armenian quote.

In Nazi Conspiracy and Aggression (colloquially also known as "the Red Set"), a collection of documents relating to the Nuremberg trials prepared by the prosecutorial team, the editors describe the relation between the documents concerned as follows:

In his book What about Germany?, Lochner offered the following English translation of the third paragraph of the document L-3:

See also
 Hitler's Armenian reference
 Occupation of Poland (1939–1945)
 Expulsion of Poles by Germany
 Anti-Polonism
 Anti-Armenianism
 Functionalism versus intentionalism
 War of annihilation

Notes

References

External links
 Nuremberg Trials, 26 November 1945 session
 2008 scholarly article by Richard Albrecht (in German): "'Wer redet heute noch von der Vernichtung der Armenier?' Adolf Hitlers Geheimrede am 22. August 1939: Das historische L-3-Dokument," in: Zeitschrift für Genozidforschung 9:1 (2008) (Zeitschrift des Instituts für Diaspora- und Genozidforschung an der Ruhr-Universität Bochum), pp. 93–131.

Document forgeries
20th-century controversies
Speeches by Adolf Hitler
1939 in Poland
Aftermath of the Armenian genocide
Political quotes
Quotations from military
August 1939 events
1939 in Germany
1939 speeches
1930s neologisms